E32 is a road in the international E-road network, located completely within the United Kingdom. Although the United Kingdom Government participates fully in activities concerning the E-routes, E-routes are not signposted within the United Kingdom.

It follows the A120 road. In the western part it is similar to a motorway but not signposted as such. The rest is ordinary road. It carries many heavy vehicles. It connects to the E30 and to the ferries from Harwich to Belgium, Netherlands, Germany and Denmark.

References

External links 
 UN Economic Commission for Europe: Overall Map of E-road Network (2007)

32
32
32